Thaisella trinitatensis is a species of sea snail, a marine gastropod mollusk, in the family Muricidae, the murex snails or rock snails.

Description
The length of the shell attains 45 mm.

Distribution
The type locality is contained in Trinidad and Tobago; also in the Atlantic Ocean off Brazil.

Habitat
This species is found in the following habitats:
 Brackish
 Marine

References

External links
 Guppy, R. J. L. (1869). Notice of some new marine shells found on the shores of Trinidad. Proceedings of the Scientific Association of Trinidad. 1(7): 366-369

trinitatensis
Gastropods described in 1869